Vasek Pospisil and Jack Sock were the defending champions, but Pospisil chose to play in Tokyo instead. Sock played alongside Bernard Tomic but lost in the final to Pablo Carreño Busta and Rafael Nadal, who won 6−7(6−8), 6−2, [10−8].

Seeds

Draw

Draw

Qualifying

Seeds

Qualifiers
  Paolo Lorenzi /  Guido Pella

Qualifying draw

References
 Main Draw
 Qualifying Draw

Open Mens Doubles